For the Power of the Soviets is a 1956 Soviet drama film directed by Boris Buneev

Plot 
The film takes place during the Great Patriotic War. The lawyer Bachey dreamed of going on a trip, but he had to go to the front. He was afraid that he would not soon see his father again, but met him in the Odessa catacombs, where partisans lived, led by a friend of Bachey. Bachey enters his squad...

Cast 
 Aleksey Alekseev as General
 Boris Chirkov as Secreatary Chernoivanenko
 Sergei Kurilov as Pyotr Bachei
 Ilya Nabatov as Ionel Mirya
 Daniil Sagal as Druzhinin
 Boris Tenin as Kolesnichuk
 Aleksey Vanin
 Anna Volgina as Klavdiya Ivanovna (as A. Volgina)

References

External links 
 

1956 films
Soviet drama films
1950s Russian-language films
1956 drama films
Soviet black-and-white films